The 2008–09 Memphis Tigers men's basketball team represented the University of Memphis in the 2008–09 college basketball season, the 88th season of Tiger basketball. The Tigers were coached by ninth-year head coach John Calipari, and they played their home games at the FedExForum in Memphis, Tennessee.

Recruiting

Roster

Schedule

|-
!colspan=12 style=|Regular season

|-
!colspan=12 style=|Conference USA Tournament 

|-
!colspan=12 style=|NCAA Tournament

Rankings

Notes

Memphis Tigers men's basketball seasons
Memphis
Memphis
Memphis
Memphis